T. vulgaris may refer to:
 Tylenchorhynchus vulgaris, a plant pathogenic nematode species
 Typhlodromus vulgaris, a predatory mite species

See also
 Vulgaris (disambiguation)